Cong River (sông Công) is a river in Central Vietnam

The Kong River, also known as the Xe Kong or the Se Kong (Lao: ເຊກອງ Se Kong, (Khmer:សេកុង(official) or ស្រែគង្គ(Khmerization)), Vietnamese: sông Sê Kông) is a river in Southeast Asia. The river originates in Thừa Thiên–Huế Province in Central Vietnam and flows  through southern Laos and eastern Cambodia. It joins the Mekong River near Stung Treng town of Cambodia. Part of its course forms the international boundary between Laos and Cambodia.

Tributaries 
 Xe Kaman River

Rivers of Thừa Thiên Huế province
Rivers of Laos
Rivers of Cambodia
International rivers of Asia
Cambodia–Laos border
Tributaries of the Mekong River
Border rivers
Rivers of Vietnam